Mu Se District is a district of the Shan State in Burma (Myanmar). , it consisted of 4 towns and 1162 villages.  The capital is at Muse.

Townships

The district contains the following townships:

Kutkai Township
Mu Se Township
Nanhkan Township

References

Districts of Myanmar
Geography of Shan State